Magda Castillo (born 30 May 1978) is a Honduran long-distance runner. In 2001, she competed in the women's marathon at the 2001 World Championships in Athletics held in Edmonton, Alberta, Canada. She finished in 48th place.

References

External links 
 

Living people
1978 births
Place of birth missing (living people)
Honduran female long-distance runners
Honduran female marathon runners
World Athletics Championships athletes for Honduras